Farshut (from ) is a city in the Qena Governorate, Egypt. Its population was estimated at 70,000 people in 2020.

References 

Populated places in Qena Governorate